The Israeli Internet Exchange (IIX) is an Internet exchange point (IXP) that provides peering services for the Internet Service Providers in Israel, essentially routing all intra-Israel internet traffic. It is managed by the non-profit Israel Internet Association organization making it as well a not-for-profit operation.

Until June 1996 much of the Israeli Internet service providers were connected by and to ILAN (the Israeli Academic Network), by order of the Ministry of Communications these links had to be dismantled. This could have created a gap which would have caused intra-Israel traffic to be routed through North America. Te Israel Internet Association decided to create IIX, to optimize Israeli routing.

See also
 List of Internet exchange points
 Internet exchange points
 Internet in Israel
 Israel Internet Association

References

External links

Internet exchange points in Israel
Hod HaSharon